Thrash may refer to:

Thrashing (computer science), where increasing resources are used to do a decreasing amount of work
Thrash (surname)
Thrash, mascot of the Atlanta Thrashers
Thrash Rally, a top-down perspective rally racing video game developed by ADK
A synonym for a Strike (attack)

Music 
Thrash metal, a riff-driven subgenre of heavy metal
Crossover thrash, a fusion of thrash metal with hardcore punk
Groove metal, a subgenre of heavy metal also known as post-thrash
Thrashcore, a subgenre of hardcore punk
Bandana thrash, a subgenre of thrashcore
Thrash, the nickname of British electronic musician, record producer and remixer Kris Weston
Thrash Anthems, a 2007 compilation album released by thrash metal band Destruction
"Thrash Unreal", a 2007 single by punk group Against Me!
Thrash Zone, a 1989 album by the American crossover thrash band D.R.I.

Places 
Thrash, West Virginia, former unincorporated community in Braxton County, West Virginia, United States

See also
 Thresh (disambiguation)